Daehwa-myeon is a myeon (township) in Pyeongchang county of Gangwon-do South Korea. The myeon is located in northern central part of the county. The total area of Daehwa-myeon is 166.65 square kilometers, and, as of 2008, the population was 5,942 people.

TV shows 
 Happy Sunday and 2 Days & 1 Night have been shot in a local farm in August 2009.

References 

Pyeongchang County
Towns and townships in Gangwon Province, South Korea